"So Glad You're Mine" is a song by Australian band Sherbet. It was released in January 1974 as the lead single from the band's third studio album, Slipstream. It reached number 44 on the Kent Music Report. 

The song was written by Sherbet members Garth Porter and Clive Shakespeare.

Track listing

Personnel 
 Bass, vocals – Tony Mitchell
 Drums – Alan Sandow 
 Engineer – Richard Batchens 
 Guitar, vocals – Clive Shakespeare 
 Keyboards, vocals – Garth Porter 
 Lead vocals – Daryl Braithwaite

Charts

References

1974 singles
1974 songs
Sherbet (band) songs
Infinity Records singles
Festival Records singles
Songs written by Garth Porter
Songs written by Clive Shakespeare